The Australian Athletics Team has been known as the Australian Flame since 2009. The team participates in several world multi-event athletics competitions: Summer Olympics, IAAF World Championships, IAAF World Indoor Championships and the Commonwealth Games. Australia also participates in specific event world championships including IAAF World Cross Country Championships and IAAF World Race Walking Cup.

As of 2015, three athletes that have been inducted into the IAAF Hall of Fame: Shirley Strickland de la Hunty, Betty Cuthbert and Marjorie Jackson. In 2000, Athletics Australia established its Hall of Fame.

Olympic Games

As of the 2012 Olympics, there have been fifteen gold medallists: Edwin Flack (dual), Nick Winter, John Winter, Marjorie Jackson (dual), Shirley Strickland de la Hunty (triple), Betty Cuthbert (four), Norma Croker (Relay), Fleur Mellor (relay), Herb Elliott, Ralph Doubell, Maureen Caird, Glynis Nunn, Debbie Flintoff-King, Cathy Freeman, Steve Hooker and Sally Pearson.

IAAF World Championships in Athletics

As of the 2019 World Championships, there have been nine world champions: Robert de Castella, Cathy Freeman (dual), Jana Pittman (dual), Dmitri Markov, Nathan Deakes, Steven Hooker, Dani Samuels, Sally Pearson(dual) and Kelsey-Lee Barber (dual).

IAAF World Indoor Championships in Athletics
As of the 2014 World Championships, there have been seven world indoor champions: Michael Hillardt, Kerry Saxby, Melinda Gainsford, Tamsyn Lewis, Steven Hooker, Fabrice Lapierre and Sally Pearson.

Commonwealth Games

IAAF World Junior Championships in Athletics

IAAF World Youth Championships in Athletics

Paralympic Games

IPC Athletics World Championships

See also
Australian Paralympic Athletics Team
Athletics in Australia

References

External links
 Athletics Australia International Results

National team
Athletics
Australia